Edith Smith may refer to:
Edith Smith (artist) (1867–1954), Canadian painter and teacher
Edith Smith (police officer) (1876–1923), first female police officer in the United Kingdom with full power of arrest
Edith Philip Smith (1897–1976), Scottish botanist and teacher

See also
Edith Bowman (born 1974), Scottish radio DJ and TV presenter, whose married name is Smith
Faith Edith Smith (1873–1957), American librarian
Edith Smith Davis (1859–1918), major leader in the temperance movement